The 1965 CONCACAF Champions' Cup was the edition of the annual international club football competition held in the CONCACAF region (North America, Central America and the Caribbean), the CONCACAF Champions' Cup. It determined that year's club champion of association football in the CONCACAF region.

The tournament was played by 12 teams of 12 nations: Costa Rica, El Salvador, Guatemala, Honduras, Nicaragua, Panama, Jamaica, Haiti, Cuba, Netherlands Antilles, Dutch Guiana, Trinidad and Tobago. The tournament was played from 3 October 1965 till 31 March 1966.

The teams were split in 3 zones (North American, Central American and Caribbean), each one qualifying the winner to the final tournament, where the winners of the North and Central zones played a semi-final to decide who was going to play against the Caribbean champion in the final. All the matches in the tournament were played under the home/away match system.

No champion was crowned for the second consecutive year since the final of the tournament could not be held: the tournament was declared void.

North American Zone
The Zone was scratched because no club entered.

Central American Zone

First round

Second round

Third round

Caribbean Zone

First round

Group A
All matches were scheduled to be held in Willemstad, Netherlands Antilles from 13 December to 17 December 1965, but were cancelled.

Group B
All matches were scheduled to be held in Oranjestad, Netherlands Antilles from 13 December to 17 December 1965, but were cancelled.

Second round
The match was scheduled to take place on December 19, 1965 in Willemstad, Netherlands Antilles, but was cancelled.

Final

Due to the Caribbean Zone tournament's cancellation and no club entering the North American Zone, the tournament was cancelled.

References

1
CONCACAF Champions' Cup